Bluff View Cemetery Chapel is a religious chapel in Bluff View Cemetery in Vermillion, South Dakota. It was added to the National Register of Historic Places in 2006; no other part of the surrounding cemetery is included in this listing. The South Dakota State Preservation Office cited it as "a fine example of a vernacular interpretation of the Gothic Revival style in South Dakota".

Bluff View Cemetery was founded in 1882 and is situated on top of a bluff overlooking the Missouri River Valley. It is a mix of Late Gothic Revival and Neoclassical architecture. A wrought iron sign above the door bears the cemetery name and the year the chapel was built. The front entrance is sheltered by a small porch supported by six hexagonal columns. It consists of only one small room and a cellar. Historically, the basement space was used to store caskets over the winter until the ground thawed enough to allow for burials.

References

National Register of Historic Places in Clay County, South Dakota
Buildings and structures in Vermillion, South Dakota
Religious buildings and structures completed in 1901